Harwant Kaur (born 5 July 1980) is an Indian discus thrower and shot putter. She won the silver medal at the 2002 Asian Championships, finished fourth at the 2003 Asian Championships and seventh at the 2006 Commonwealth Games. In addition she competed at the 2004 Olympic Games and was ranked 13th in the qualifying rounds. Her personal coach is Parveer Singh. At 2010 Commonwealth Games, she won the silver medal in the Discus throw event.

Her personal best throw is 63.05 metres, achieved in August 2004 in Kyiv. She contested at the 2008 Beijing Olympics, but failed to reach the finals, and was ranked 17th in the qualifiers with a throw of 56.42 m.

See also
Indian Squad for 2008 Olympics

References

External links

1980 births
Living people
Indian female discus throwers
21st-century Indian women
21st-century Indian people
Athletes (track and field) at the 2004 Summer Olympics
Athletes (track and field) at the 2008 Summer Olympics
Olympic athletes of India
Athletes (track and field) at the 2006 Commonwealth Games
Commonwealth Games silver medallists for India
Athletes (track and field) at the 2010 Commonwealth Games
Indian female shot putters
Sportswomen from Punjab, India
Athletes (track and field) at the 2002 Asian Games
Athletes (track and field) at the 2010 Asian Games
Commonwealth Games medallists in athletics
Place of birth missing (living people)
Asian Games competitors for India
Medallists at the 2010 Commonwealth Games